S. Ravi Varman (born 9 May 1972) is an Indian cinematographer, filmmaker, producer and writer. He has predominantly worked in films of Indian languages such as Tamil, Malayalam and Hindi. Known for his realistic and poetic framing sense, Ravi Varman began his career in Malayalam films. He has directed a romantic film in Tamil titled Moscowin Kavery and also filmed the music video for the song "Bird Flu" by British Tamil songwriter M.I.A.

Early life 
Ravivarman was born in a village of  Thanjavur district, Tamil Nadu, India.

Career 
He started his career by assisting cinematographer Ravi K Chandran. After working in Malayalam films since 1999 for three years, he worked in Bollywood for the film Yeh Dil in 2003. He later worked in the Telugu film Jai and received more offers in Hindi, such as Armaan, Bee Busthar, Ramji Londonwale, and Phir Milenge, His next project is going to be with Maniratnam.

It was not until 2002 when he started to work in Tamil films, with his first one being Susi Ganeshan's Five Star. He continued to work with popular directors as cinematographer in Tamil films, including S. Shankar's Anniyan, Gautham Vasudev Menon's Vettaiyaadu Vilaiyaadu, K. S. Ravikumar's Dasavathaaram and Villu, which was directed by Prabhu Deva. Besides feature films, he has credit of working on more than 500 Television Commercials, Music Albums, Short Films and Documentary. Nonetheless, his flair for literature has led him to embark on writing for an on-line literary magazine 'Yavarum kelir' for Tamiz studio.

Awards and honours

23rd EME France Film Festival Best Cinematographer Award for Santham Malayalam (2000)
 Filmfare Best Cinematographer Award for Anniyan (2006)
 Tamil Nadu State Film Award for Best Cinematographer for Vettaiyaadu Vilaiyaadu (2007)
 Vikitan Best Cinematography Award (South) for Vettaiyaadu Vilaiyaadu (2007)
 ITFA Best Cinematographer Award for Dasavathaaram (2009)
 Star Guild Awards for Best Cinematography for Barfi! (2012)
 Screen Awards for Best cinematography for Barfi! (2012)
 TOIFA Awards for Best Cinematography for Barfi! (2012)
 IIFA Awards for Best Cinematography for Barfi! (2012)
 Zee Cine Awards for Best cinematography for  Goliyon Ki Raasleela Ram-Leela (2014)
Vijay Award for Best Cinematography for Kaatru Veliyidai (2017)
SIIMA Award for Best Cinematography for Kaatru Veliyidai (2017)

Filmography

As director 

 Moscowin Kavery (2010)
 Treasure Music Video (2011) Also as Cinematographer and Lyricist

As producer 

 Azhagu (2010)
 Vellaiya Irukiravan Poi Solla Maatan (2015)

As cinematographer

Films

As guest cinematographer

Music videos 

 "Bird Flu" by M.I.A. (2007)
"Aarachar" by Thaikkudam Bridge (2016)

Documentaries

 Child Environment

Notes

References

External links
Official Website
 

Living people
Cinematographers from Tamil Nadu
Malayalam film cinematographers
Filmfare Awards South winners
People from Thanjavur district
Tamil film cinematographers
Tamil Nadu State Film Awards winners
21st-century Indian photographers
Film producers from Tamil Nadu
Film directors from Tamil Nadu
Telugu film cinematographers
Tamil film producers
Tamil film directors
1972 births